John Lee "Squint" Phares (December 31, 1915 – August 16, 1974) was an American professional basketball player. He played college basketball, baseball, and football for West Virginia University. Phares then played in the National Basketball League for the Pittsburgh Pirates during the 1938–39 season and averaged 6.9 points per game. 

In his post-basketball life, he and his wife ran a nursery school in Columbus, Ohio.

References

1915 births
1974 deaths
American men's basketball players
Baseball players from Columbus, Ohio
Baseball players from West Virginia
Basketball players from Columbus, Ohio
Basketball players from West Virginia
Forwards (basketball)
Guards (basketball)
People from Elkins, West Virginia
Pittsburgh Pirates (NBL) players
Players of American football from Columbus, Ohio
Players of American football from West Virginia
West Virginia Mountaineers baseball players
West Virginia Mountaineers football players
West Virginia Mountaineers men's basketball players